Edwin Duhon (11 June 1910 – 26 February 2006) was an American musician and co-founder of the Hackberry Ramblers, a band playing a combination of Cajun music, Western swing, and country music.

Duhon was born in Broussard, Louisiana. He formed the Hackberry Ramblers along with fiddler Luderin Darbone in 1933. He first played acoustic guitar and went on to play electric guitar, piano, double bass, harmonica, and accordion at various times. He focused solely on the accordion from the mid-1990s. Duhon's last performance was in November 2005.

In 2002, Duhon and Darbone received a National Heritage Fellowship from the U.S. National Endowment for the Arts, which is the country's highest honor in the folk and traditional arts.

Duhon died at the age of 95 in Westlake, Louisiana.

See also
History of Cajun Music
List of Notable People Related to Cajun Music

References

External links

Hackberry Ramblers Official Website
Musician Edwin Duhon dead at 95 United Press International, Inc. Retrieved 20 Mar 2006.

1910 births
2006 deaths
People from Broussard, Louisiana
Cajun musicians
Musicians from Louisiana
National Heritage Fellowship winners
20th-century American musicians